Boco Rock Wind Farm is a wind farm 10km southwest of Nimmitabel in the Snowy Mountains region of New South Wales, Australia. It has 67 GE 100-1.7 wind turbines with a hub height of 80m, and generates up to 113MW of electricity. It is managed by the developers, CWP Renewables but is now owned by EGCO.

The engineering, procurement and construction contract for the wind farm was let in June 2013 to a consortium of GE and Downer EDI. The electricity generated is contracted for sale to EnergyAustralia.

Operations 
The wind farm began grid output in August 2014 and was fully commissioned in November 2014 and has operated continuously since then. The generation table uses eljmkt nemlog to obtain generation values for each month. 

Note: Asterisk indicates power output was limited during the month.

References

Wind farms in New South Wales